Shen Jun may refer to:

 Shen Jun (archer) (born 1972), Chinese archer
 Shen Jun (businessman) (born 1970), Chinese businessman
 Shen Jun (judoka) (born 1977), Chinese judoka
 Shen Jun (footballer) (born 1986), Chinese footballer